Cerithiopsis agulhasensis is a species of very small sea snails, marine gastropod molluscs in the family Cerithiopsidae. It was described by Thiele in 1925.

References

agulhasensis
Gastropods described in 1925